Wílmer Cabrera Linares (born September 15, 1967) is a Colombian former football defender and current head coach of Rio Grande Valley FC Toros in the USL Championship. He previously coached for Chivas USA and Houston Dynamo, as well as the United States men's national under-17 soccer team. During his playing career, Cabrera played as a right back for clubs in the Colombian league and the Colombia national team, representing the country at the 1998 FIFA World Cup.

Career

Cabrera, born in Cartagena, Colombia, and raised in Bogotá, made his professional debut at the age of 17 for Santa Fe. His 18-year playing career included stints at América de Cali (reaching the 1996 Copa Libertadores Final), Millonarios, Chicó, Independiente of Argentina, Herediano of Costa Rica and the Long Island Rough Riders of the United States.

International career

Cabrera was capped 48 times and scored 3 international goals for Colombia between 1989 and 1998. He was an unused substitute during the 1990 FIFA World Cup but played in all of the country's three matches in the 1998 FIFA World Cup. He also played in four Copa América competitions in 1989, 1991, 1995 and 1997.

Coaching career

After retiring, Cabrera settled permanently in the United States to pursue work as a helicopter pilot in the New York area. He began working with the Major League Soccer front office as a community development manager working on Hispanic grassroots and youth programs. He also worked as an assistant coach for the Suffolk County Community College men's soccer team as well as top-ranked youth soccer club B.W. Gottschee, based in Queens, New York.

Cabrera earned his United States Soccer Federation A Coaching License in 2005 and became an assistant coach with the United States men's national under-18 soccer team in 2007. He was named by the USSF as head coach of the United States men's national under-17 soccer team on October 25, 2007, becoming the first Latin American head coach in the U.S. national team system. On January 24, 2012, he was replaced in this role by Richie Williams.

In January 2012, Cabrera was named assistant coach for the Colorado Rapids of Major League Soccer.

In January 2014, Chivas USA appointed Cabrera as head coach. The club was dissolved by the league at the end of the season, with Cabrera's team finishing seventh in the Western Conference, the highest finish for Chivas USA in their final five seasons.

Cabrera was named head coach of the Rio Grande Valley FC Toros of the United Soccer League on December 2, 2015.

Cabrera was named head coach of the Houston Dynamo on October 28, 2016. He and the Dynamo parted ways on August 13, 2019.

Cabrera became head coach of the Montreal Impact on August 21, 2019. On October 24, 2019, the Impact announced that his contract would not be renewed for the 2020 season.

Managerial statistics

Honours

Players

Coach

References

External links

1967 births
1989 Copa América players
1990 FIFA World Cup players
1991 Copa América players
1995 Copa América players
1997 Copa América players
1998 FIFA World Cup players
América de Cali footballers
Argentine Primera División players
Boyacá Chicó F.C. footballers
C.S. Herediano footballers
Categoría Primera A players
Chivas USA coaches
Club Atlético Independiente footballers
Colombia international footballers
Colombia under-20 international footballers
Colombian expatriate footballers
Colombian football managers
Colombian footballers
Colorado Rapids non-playing staff
Deportes Tolima footballers
Expatriate footballers in Argentina
Expatriate footballers in Costa Rica
Expatriate soccer players in the United States
Independiente Santa Fe footballers
Living people
Long Island Rough Riders players
Major League Soccer coaches
Millonarios F.C. players
USL Second Division players
Association football defenders
Houston Dynamo FC coaches
Rio Grande Valley FC Toros coaches
CF Montréal coaches
Sportspeople from Cartagena, Colombia